Simona Brambilla I.S.M.C, is an Italian Roman Catholic nun and missionary, one of the seven first women appointed members of the Congregation for Institutes of Consecrated Life and Societies of Apostolic Life, the second highest-ranking department of the Roman Curia, the administrative institution of the Holy See, since 8 July 2019, when she was appointed by Pope Francis.

She was elected Superior Generale of the women branch of Consolata Missionaries on 7 June 2011 and member of institution's General Council since 2005. She was born in Brianza, a region in north of Italy, got a degree in Psychology from the Pontifical Gregorian University and had been missionary in Mozambique.

References 

Living people
21st-century Italian Roman Catholic religious sisters and nuns
Women officials of the Roman Curia
Superiors general
Italian Roman Catholic missionaries
Female Roman Catholic missionaries
Members of the Congregation for Institutes of Consecrated Life and Societies of Apostolic Life
Pontifical Gregorian University alumni
People from Brianza
Year of birth missing (living people)